Červená Voda refers to:

 Červená Voda (Ústí nad Orlicí District), village in the Pardubice Region of the Czech Republic
 Červená Voda, Sabinov District, village and municipality in Sabinov District in the Prešov Region of Slovakia

See also
Stará Červená Voda